A rubber-tyred metro or rubber-tired metro is a form of rapid transit system that uses a mix of road and rail technology. The vehicles have wheels with rubber tires that run on rolling pads inside guide bars for traction, as well as traditional railway steel wheels with deep flanges on steel tracks for guidance through conventional switches as well as guidance in case a tyre fails. Most rubber-tyred trains are purpose-built and designed for the system on which they operate. Guided buses are sometimes referred to as 'trams on tyres', and compared to rubber-tyred metros.

History
The first idea for rubber-tyred railway vehicles was the work of Scotsman Robert William Thomson, the original inventor of the pneumatic tyre. In his patent of 1846 he describes his 'Aerial Wheels' as being equally suitable for, "the ground or rail or track on which they run". The patent also included a drawing of such a railway, with the weight carried by pneumatic main wheels running on a flat board track and guidance provided by small horizontal steel wheels running on the sides of a central vertical guide rail. A similar arrangement was patented by Alejandro Goicoechea, inventor of Talgo, in February 1936, patent ES 141056; in 1973, he built a development of this patent: 'Tren Vertebrado', Patent DE1755198; at Avenida Marítima, in Las Palmas de Gran Canaria.

During the World War II German occupation of Paris, the Metro system was used to capacity, with relatively little maintenance performed. At the end of the war, the system was so worn that thought was given as to how to renovate it. Rubber-tyred metro technology was first applied to the Paris Métro, developed by Michelin, who provided the tyres and guidance system, in collaboration with Renault, who provided the vehicles. Starting in 1951, an experimental vehicle, the MP 51, operated on a test track between Porte des Lilas and Pré Saint Gervais, a section of line not open to the public.

Line 11 Châtelet – Mairie des Lilas was the first line to be converted, in 1956, chosen because of its steep grades. This was followed by Line 1 Château de Vincennes – Pont de Neuilly in 1964, and Line 4 Porte d'Orléans – Porte de Clignancourt in 1967, converted because they had the heaviest traffic load of all Paris Métro lines. Finally, Line 6 Charles de Gaulle – Étoile – Nation was converted in 1974 to reduce train noise on its many elevated sections. Because of the high cost of converting existing rail-based lines, this is no longer done in Paris, or elsewhere. Now, rubber-tyred metros are used in new systems or lines only, including the new Paris Métro Line 14.

The first completely rubber-tyred metro system was built in Montreal, Quebec, Canada, in 1966. Santiago Metro and Mexico City Metro are based on Paris Métro rubber-tyred trains. A few more recent rubber-tyred systems have used automated, driverless trains; one of the first such systems, developed by Matra, opened in 1983 in Lille, and others have since been built in Toulouse and Rennes. Paris Metro Line 14 was automated from its beginning (1998), and Line 1 was converted to automatic in 2007–2011. The first automated rubber-tyred system opened in Kobe, Japan, in February 1981. It is the Port Liner linking Sannomiya railway station with Port Island.

Technology

Overview

Trains are usually in the form of electric multiple units. Just as on a conventional railway, the driver does not have to steer, with the system relying on some sort of guideway to direct the train. The type of guideway varies between networks. Most use two parallel roll ways, each the width of a tyre, which are made of various materials. The Montreal Metro, Lille Metro, Toulouse Metro, and most parts of Santiago Metro, use concrete. The Busan Subway Line 4 employs a concrete slab. The Paris Métro, Mexico City Metro, and the non-underground section of Santiago Metro, use H-Shaped hot rolled steel, and the Sapporo Municipal Subway uses flat steel. The Sapporo system and Lille Metro use a single central guide rail only.

On some systems, such those in Paris, Montreal, and Mexico City, there is a conventional  railway track between the roll ways. The bogies of the train include railway wheels with longer flanges than normal. These conventional wheels are normally just above the rails, but come into use in the case of a flat tyre, or at switches (points) and crossings. In Paris these rails were also used to enable mixed traffic, with rubber-tyred and steel-wheeled trains using the same track, particularly during conversion from normal railway track. The VAL system, used in Lille and Toulouse, has other sorts of flat-tyre compensation and switching methods.

On most systems, the electric power is supplied from one of the guide bars, which serves as a third rail. The current is picked up by a separate lateral pickup shoe. The return current passes via a return shoe to one or both of the conventional railway tracks, which are part of most systems, or to the other guide bar.

Rubber tyres have higher rolling resistance than traditional steel railway wheels. There are some advantages and disadvantages to increased rolling resistance, causing them to not be used in certain countries.

Advantages
Compared to steel wheel on steel rail, the advantages of rubber-tyred metro systems are:
 Faster acceleration, along with the ability to climb or descend steeper slopes (approximately a gradient of 13%) than would be feasible with conventional rail tracks, which would likely need a rack instead.
 For example, the rubber-tyred Line 2 of the Lausanne Metro has grades of up to 12%.
 Shorter braking distances, allowing trains to be signalled closer together.
 Quieter rides in open air (both inside and outside the train).
 Greatly reduced rail wear with resulting reduced maintenance costs of those parts.

Disadvantages
The higher friction and increased rolling resistance cause disadvantages (compared to steel wheel on steel rail):
 Higher energy consumption.
Worse ride, when compared with well-maintained steel-on-steel systems.
 Possibility of tyre blow-outs - not possible in railway wheels.
 Normal operation generates more heat (from friction).
 Weather variance. (Applicable only to above-ground installations)
 Loss of the traction-advantage in inclement weather (snow and ice).
 Same expense of steel rails for switching purposes, to provide electricity or grounding to the trains and as a safety backup.
 Tyres that frequently need to be replaced; contrary to rails using steel wheels, which need to be replaced less often.
 Tyres break down during use and turn into particulate matter (dust), which can be hazardous air pollution, also coating surrounding surfaces in dirty rubber dust.

Although it is a more complex technology, most rubber-tyred metro systems use quite simple techniques, in contrast to guided buses. Heat dissipation is an issue as eventually all traction energy consumed by the train — except the electric energy regenerated back into the substation during electrodynamic braking — will end up in losses (mostly heat). In frequently operated tunnels (typical metro operation) the extra heat from rubber tyres is a widespread problem, necessitating ventilation of the tunnels. As a result, some rubber-tyred metro systems do not have air-conditioned trains, as air conditioning would heat the tunnels to temperatures where operation is not possible.

Similar technologies
Automated driverless systems are not exclusively rubber-tyred; many have since been built using conventional rail technology, such as London's Docklands Light Railway, the Copenhagen metro and Vancouver's SkyTrain, the Hong Kong Disneyland Resort line, which uses converted rolling stocks from non-driverless trains, as well as AirTrain JFK, which links JFK Airport in New York City with local subway and commuter trains. Most monorail manufacturers prefer rubber tyres.

List of systems

Under construction

Defunct systems

See also

 Budd–Michelin rubber-tired rail cars
 Flat tire
 Guided bus
 Hybrid systems
 Medium-capacity rail transport system
 Micheline
 Outline of tires
 Railway electrification system
 Rubber-tyred trams
 Tyre
 Toronto Zoo Domain Ride
 Tünel – a rubber-tyred funicular in Istanbul, Turkey
 VAL (Véhicule Automatique Léger)

Notes

References

 Bindi, A. & Lefeuvre, D. (1990).  Rennes: Ouest-France. . 
 Gaillard, M. (1991).  Amiens: Martelle. . 
 Marc Dufour's "The principle behind the rubber-tired metro". (English)

External links
 Visual dictionary
 TRUCK (bogie) 
 Rail system
 (Jane's) Urban Transit Systems

Scottish inventions